Spartak Stadium is a multi-use stadium in Bobruisk, Belarus. It is currently used mostly for football matches and is the home ground of Belshina Bobruisk as well as women's team Bobruichanka Bobruisk. The stadium holds 3,700 people.

The stadium was opened in April 1934 and reconstructed in 2004 and 2006 to get a modern look and bigger capacity.

References

External links
Stadium profile at Belshina website
Stadium profile at pressball.by

Football venues in Belarus
Babruysk
Buildings and structures in Mogilev Region